Leukemia virus may refer to:

 Abelson murine leukemia virus
 Bovine leukemia virus
 Feline leukemia virus
 Human T-lymphotropic virus
 Murine leukemia virus
 Xenotropic murine leukemia virus-related virus
 Gibbon-ape leukemia virus

See also
 Leucosis